George Dance may refer to:

 George Dance the Elder, English architect
 George Dance the Younger, English architect, son of George Dance the Elder
 George Dance (politician), Canadian politician
 Sir George Dance (dramatist), English lyricist and librettist